Lakelands Park is a park located in the Lakelands neighborhood of the City of Gaithersburg, Montgomery County, Maryland. The park includes two baseball/softball fields, a playground, and a large grassy area usually used for soccer. This park is located next to Lakelands Park Middle School.

References 

Parks in Montgomery County, Maryland
Gaithersburg, Maryland